High-strength low-alloy steel (HSLA) is a type of alloy steel that provides better mechanical properties or greater resistance to corrosion than carbon steel. HSLA steels vary from other steels in that they are not made to meet a specific chemical composition but rather specific mechanical properties. They have a carbon content between 0.05 and 0.25% to retain formability and weldability. Other alloying elements include up to 2.0% manganese and small quantities of copper, nickel, niobium, nitrogen, vanadium, chromium, molybdenum, titanium, calcium, rare-earth elements, or zirconium. Copper, titanium, vanadium, and niobium are added for strengthening purposes. These elements are intended to alter the microstructure of carbon steels, which is usually a ferrite-pearlite aggregate, to produce a very fine dispersion of alloy carbides in an almost pure ferrite matrix. This eliminates the toughness-reducing effect of a pearlitic volume fraction yet maintains and increases the material's strength by refining the grain size, which in the case of ferrite increases yield strength by 50% for every halving of the mean grain diameter. Precipitation strengthening plays a minor role, too. Because of their higher strength and toughness HSLA steels usually require 25 to 30% more power to form, as compared to carbon steels.

Copper, silicon, nickel, chromium, and phosphorus are added to increase corrosion resistance. Zirconium, calcium, and rare-earth elements are added for sulfide-inclusion shape control which increases formability. These are needed because most HSLA steels have directionally sensitive properties. Formability and impact strength can vary significantly when tested longitudinally and transversely to the grain. Bends that are parallel to the longitudinal grain are more likely to crack around the outer edge because it experiences tensile loads. This directional characteristic is substantially reduced in HSLA steels that have been treated for sulfide shape control.

They are used in cars, trucks, cranes, bridges, roller coasters and other structures that are designed to handle large amounts of stress or need a good strength-to-weight ratio. HSLA steel cross-sections and structures are usually 20 to 30% lighter than a carbon steel with the same strength.

HSLA steels are also more resistant to rust than most carbon steels because of their lack of pearlite – the fine layers of ferrite (almost pure iron) and cementite in pearlite. HSLA steels usually have densities of around 7800 kg/m3.

Military armour plate is mostly made from alloy steels, although some civilian armour against small arms is now made from HSLA steels with extreme low temperature quenching.

Classifications
 Weathering steels: Steels which have better corrosion resistance. A common example is COR-TEN.
 Control-rolled steels: Hot rolled steels which have a highly deformed austenite structure that will transform to a very fine equiaxed ferrite structure upon cooling.
 Pearlite-reduced steels: Low carbon content steels which lead to little or no pearlite, but rather a very fine grain ferrite matrix. It is strengthened by precipitation hardening.
 Acicular ferrite steels: These steels are characterized by a very fine high strength acicular ferrite structure, a very low carbon content, and good hardenability.
 Dual-phase steels: These steels have a ferrite microstructure that contain small, uniformly distributed sections of martensite. This microstructure gives the steels a low yield strength, high rate of work hardening, and good formability.
 Microalloyed steels: Steels which contain very small additions of niobium, vanadium, and/or titanium to obtain a refined grain size and/or precipitation hardening.

A common type of micro-alloyed steel is improved-formability HSLA. It has a yield strength up to  but costs only 24% more than A36 steel. One of the disadvantages of this steel is that it is 30 to 40% less ductile. In the U.S., these steels are dictated by the ASTM standards A1008/A1008M and A1011/A1011M for sheet metal and A656/A656M for plates. These steels were developed for the automotive industry to reduce weight without losing strength. Examples of uses include door-intrusion beams, chassis members, reinforcing and mounting brackets, steering and suspension parts, bumpers, and wheels.

SAE grades
The Society of Automotive Engineers (SAE) maintains standards for HSLA steel grades because they are often used in automotive applications.

Controlled-rolling of HSLA steels

Mechanism 
Controlled rolling

Controlled rolling is a method of refining grains of steel by introducing large amount of nucleation sites for ferrite in austenite matrix by rolling with temperature control, therefore increasing the strength of steel. There are three main stages during controlled rolling:

1) Deformation in recrystallization region. In this stage, austenite is being recrystallized and refined and can thereby refine the ferrite grains in the later stage.

2) Deformation in non-recrystallization region. Austenite grains are elongated by rolling. Deformation bands might present within the band as well. Elongated grain boundaries and deformation bands are all nucleation sites for ferrite.

3) Deformation in austenite-ferrite two phase region. Ferrite nucleates and austenite are further work-hardened.

Strengthening Mechanism

Control-rolled HSLA steels contain a combination of different strengthening mechanisms. The main strengthening effect come from grain refinement (Grain boundary strengthening), where strength increase as the grain size decrease. The other mechanisms include solid solution strengthening and precipitate hardening from micro-alloyed elements. After the steel passes the temperature of austenite-ferrite region, it is then further strengthened by work hardening.

Mechanical properties 
Control-rolled HSLA steels usually have higher strength and toughness, as well as lower ductile-brittle transition temperature and ductile fracture properties. Below are some common micro-alloyed elements used to improve the mechanical properties.

Effect of micro-alloyed elements:

Niobium: Nb can increase the recrystallization temperature by around 100 °C, thereby extending the non-recrystallization region and slow down the grain growth. Nb can both increase the strength and toughness by precipitate strengthening and grain refinement. Moreover, Nb is a strong carbide/nitride former, the Nb(C, N) formed can hinder grain growth during austenite-to-ferrite transition.  

Vanadium: V can significantly increase the strength and transition temperature by precipitate strengthening.

Titanium: Ti have a slight increase in strengthen via both grain refinement and precipitate strengthening.

Nb, V, and Ti are three common alloying elements in HSLA steels. They are all good carbide and nitride former, where the precipitates formed can prevent grain growth by pinning grain boundary. They are also all ferrite former, which increase the transition temperature of austenite-ferrite two phase region and reduce the non-recrystallization region. The reduction in non-recrystallization region induces the formation of deformation bands and activated grain boundaries, which are alternative ferrite nucleation site other than grain boundaries.

Other alloying elements are mainly for solid solution strengthening including Silicon, Manganese, Chromium, Copper, and Nickel.

References

Sources 
 .
 

Steels
Armour